Bertolotti is an Italian surname. Notable people with the surname include:

Alessandro Bertolotti (born 1960), Italian writer and photographer
Andrés Bertolotti (born 1943), Argentine footballer
Bernardino Bertolotti, 16th-century Italian composer and musician
Brittany Murphy (1977-2009), American actress born as Brittany Bertolotti
Cesare Bertolotti (1854–1932), Italian painter
Gasparo Bertolotti known as Gasparo da Salò Italian luthier
Gianni Bertolotti (born 1950), Italian basketball player
Giovanni Lorenzo Bertolotti (1640–1721), Italian Baroque painter
Mariano Bertolottif (born 1982), Argentine judoka

See also
Bertolotti's syndrome, back pain

Italian-language surnames